Adrian Edward Zieliński (born 28 March 1989) is a Polish weightlifter. He is the 2012 Olympic champion in the men's 85 kg category.

Personal life 
Adrian Edward Zieliński was born on 28 March 1989 in Nakło nad Notecią. He is the brother of Tomasz Zieliński, who is also a weightlifter.

Career
Zieliński formerly competed in the 85 kg category. He won a gold medal at the 2010 World Championships in Antalya, Turkey with a 383 kg total. He took bronze at the 2011 World Championships in Paris. At the 2012 Summer Olympics in London, he won gold with a total of 385 kg.

In 2014, Zieliński moved to the 94 kg category. He won gold at the 2014 European Championships in Tel Aviv and silver at the 2015 World Championships in Houston. He was disqualified from the 2016 Summer Olympics after an illegal substance (nandrolone) was detected in his A sample from the Polish national championships in July.

References

External links

 
 
 
 
 
 Adrian Zielinski at The-Sports.org

1989 births
Living people
Polish male weightlifters
Olympic weightlifters of Poland
Weightlifters at the 2012 Summer Olympics
Olympic gold medalists for Poland
World Weightlifting Championships medalists
People from Nakło nad Notecią
Olympic medalists in weightlifting
Medalists at the 2012 Summer Olympics
Sportspeople from Kuyavian-Pomeranian Voivodeship
Doping cases in weightlifting
Polish sportspeople in doping cases
European Weightlifting Championships medalists
20th-century Polish people
21st-century Polish people